Hollis Robbins (born 1963) is an American academic and essayist; Robbins currently serves as Dean of Humanities at University of Utah. Her scholarship focuses on African-American literature.

Education and early career 
Robbins was born and raised in New Hampshire. She entered Johns Hopkins University at the age of 16 and received her B.A. in 1983. From 1986 to 1988 Robbins worked at The New Yorker Magazine in the marketing and promotions department. She received a master's degree in Public Policy from Harvard's Kennedy School of Government in 1990, and subsequently enrolled as a doctoral student in the Department of Communication at Stanford University in 1991. 

After working in politics and public policy in California and Colorado, Robbins returned to school to pursue an M.A. in English literature from the University of Colorado Boulder in 1998, and a Ph.D. from Princeton University in 2003, where her dissertation focused on the literary representations of bureaucracy in 19th century British and American literature.

Academic career 
After receiving her PhD, from 2004 to 2006, Robbins was an assistant professor of English at Millsaps College in Jackson, Mississippi. In 2004 she also became Co-Director with Henry Louis Gates, Jr. of the Black Periodical Literature Project at Harvard’s Hutchins Center for African and African American Research. From 2006 to 2017 Robbins was a faculty member and then Chair of the Department of Humanities at the Peabody Institute of Johns Hopkins University where she taught a class in film music with Thomas Dolby. Robbins was the Director of the Center for Africana Studies at Johns Hopkins, from 2014 to 2017. From 2014 to 2018, she served on the Faculty Editorial Board of the Johns Hopkins University Press and from 2011-2017 served on the board of the $400M Johns Hopkins Federal Credit Union. She won the 2014 Johns Hopkins University Alumni Excellence in Teaching Award, a 2015 Johns Hopkins University Discovery Award, and a 2017-2018 fellowship from the National Humanities Center.

Robbins became Dean of Humanities at the University of Utah on July 1, 2022. Previously, from 2018-2022, she was Dean of the School of Arts & Humanities at Sonoma State University in Rohnert Park, California. Her research focuses on African American history and literature.  In 2004, she began collaborating with Henry Louis Gates Jr. and co-edited  (2004). She also co-edited  (2007) with Gates. She has also written on higher education as well as African American poetry and film music. She is also a published poet.

Selected publications

As author

As editor

See also

References

External links
 .
 About the Dean of the School of Arts and Humanities at Sonoma State University.
 Black Periodical Literature Project at The Hutchins Center for African and African American Research.
 Dracula and Social Discoordination, excerpt from chapter 23 of Killing Time by Robbins.

1963 births
Living people
Johns Hopkins University faculty
Johns Hopkins University alumni
University of Colorado Boulder alumni
Black studies scholars
Princeton University alumni
American literary critics
Women literary critics
Harvard Kennedy School alumni
Harvard University people
Sonoma State University faculty
21st-century American women writers
American women editors
American women academics
American women critics